Two Lefts Don't Make a Right...but Three Do (often called Two Lefts) is the third full-length album released by Christian rock band Relient K. The album was nominated for a Grammy for Best Rock Gospel Album, but the award that year ended up being won by Worldwide by Audio Adrenaline. This album was initially released with four different covers, each one depicting a separate car wreck. In November 2003, a fifth cover was released, which showed all four cars in a junkyard. That is now the only version of the CD still in print, although a very small amount the four original covers can still be found. It was also released as a combo pack with Deck the Halls, Bruise Your Hand for a few years around Christmas time. The album peaked at No. 38 on the Billboard 200.

Two Lefts Don't Make a Right...but Three Do was certified Gold on March 21, 2005 by the RIAA for sales in excess of 500,000 in the United States. It has currently sold around 518,000 in the United States. A Gold Edition of this album was released on October 31, 2006. The idea for a Gold Edition of this album came from Gotee Records, who also released a Gold Edition of The Anatomy of the Tongue in Cheek on the same day. The Gold Edition of this album has remixed and remastered sound similar to Mmhmm (the album was remixed by the same people who mixed Mmhmm) and it is also enhanced with a music video for the song "Chap Stick, Chapped Lips, and Things Like Chemistry".

Track listing

Singles 

All singles released for Christian radio.

 "Chap Stick, Chapped Lips, and Things Like Chemistry"
 "Forward Motion"
 "In Love With the 80s (Pink Tux to the Prom)"
 "I Am Understood?"
 "Getting Into You"

Personnel 
Relient K
 Matt Thiessen – lead vocals, guitars, acoustic piano
 Matt Hoopes – guitars, backing vocals
 Brian Pittman – bass guitar
 Dave Douglas – drums, backing vocals

Additional musicians
 DJ Manuel – programming (11)
 Rob Roy Fingerhead – occasional guitars, backing vocals
 Ryan Watts – additional vocals (4, 10, 14)
 Adam Grimm, Jake Gridgeway, and Ryan Nutter – "Kids on the Street" (12)

Production 
 Joey Elwood – executive producer
 Toby McKeehan – executive producer
 Mark Lee Townsend – producer, recording 
 Matt Thiessen – co-producer 
 F. Reid Shippen – mixing at Recording Arts (Nashville, Tennessee)
 Dan Shike – mix assistant 
 Randy LeRoy – mastering at Final Stage Mastering (Nashville, Tennessee)
 Grant Harrison – A&R
 Eddy Boer – creative direction 
 Aaron Marrs – design, layout 
 Todd Francis – cover illustration 
 David Johnson – photography

References 

2003 albums
Relient K albums
Gotee Records albums
Albums produced by Mark Lee Townsend